Stalker is a surname. Some notable individuals with the surname include:

 Bill Stalker (1948–1981), New Zealand-born actor
 Francis Marion Stalker, former faculty member at Indiana State University and namesake of Stalker Hall
 Gale H. Stalker (1889–1985), Republican member of the United States House of Representatives from New York
 John Stalker (1939–2019), British police officer, author and television personality
 John Stalker (rugby union) (1881–1931), New Zealand rugby union player
 John Stalker (footballer) (born 1959), Scottish footballer
 Scott H. Stalker, officer of the United States Cyber Command and the National Security Agency
 Tom Stalker (born 1984), English professional boxer
 Walter Stalker (1909–1977), Australian cricketer